Vasnevo is a rural locality (a village) in Spasskoye Rural Settlement, Vologodsky District, Vologda Oblast, Russia. The population was 3 as of 2002.

Geography 
Vasnevo is located 27 km south of Vologda (the district's administrative centre) by road. Kolokolovo is the nearest rural locality.

References 

Rural localities in Vologodsky District